Qitai may refer to:
 Qitai County in the People's Republic of China
 Salmeterol, a bronchodilator